The Latest and Greatest is a greatest hits compilation album by Australian rock band Skyhooks. It was released by Mushroom Records in November 1990 in Australia and peaked at number 4 on the chart and was certified platinum.

Background
Skyhooks formed in inner Melbourne in 1974 and sold well across Australia with their first two albums, Living in the 70's and Ego Is Not a Dirty Word, both peaking at number 1 in 1975. It was novel to hear Australian songs about buying dope in the inner city, sex in the suburbs, the local gay scene and songs with place-specific themes such as 'Toorak Cowboy' and 'Balwyn Calling'. The group's popularity has been particularly attributed to their socially-aware lyrics and timely style.

The band had been on hiatus since 1984, but in 1988 Greg Macainsh began working on new material. This led to two new songs: "Jukebox in Siberia" and "Tall Timber". "Jukebox in Siberia" was released as a single in October 1990 and peaked at number 1 on the ARIA singles chart and opened the band to a whole new audience. As a result, their record label decided to release a new "best of" album in the November, titled The Latest and Greatest.

Track listing

Chart positions

Weekly charts

Year-end charts

Certifications

Notes
 Tracks 2, 3, 4, 5, 6 recorded at TCS Studios, Melbourne, July 1974 
 Tracks 7, 8 recorded at TCS Studios, Melbourne, May 1975 
 Track 9 recorded at TCS Studios, Melbourne, October 1975 
 Tracks 10, 12, 13 recorded at The Record Plant, Sausalito, California May 1976 
 Track 14 recorded at TCS Studios, Melbourne, February 1977 
 Tracks 11, 15 recorded at Trafalgar Studios, Sydney, October 1977 
 Tracks 1, 16 recorded at Metropolis Audio, Melbourne, August 1990

References

External links
Album at Discogs

1990 greatest hits albums
Compilation albums by Australian artists
Mushroom Records compilation albums
Skyhooks (band) albums
Mushroom Records albums